The third World Cup season began in December 1968 and concluded in March 1969.  This was the first season in which the races began prior to January 1, and that change immediately became permanent.  Karl Schranz of Austria won the first of two consecutive overall titles. Gertrude Gabl of Austria won the women's overall title.  For the first and only (as of 2016) time in World Cup history, a discipline trophy was shared by more than two people, as four men (three French, one Austrian) tied for the Men's Slalom trophy.

The race footage for the film Downhill Racer was shot during this season, primarily in January 1969.

Calendar

Men 

Note: Race 12 and 13 were held on the same day.

Women

Men

Overall 
In Men's Overall World Cup 1968/69 the best three downhills, best three giant slaloms and best three slaloms count. 17 racers had a point deduction.

Downhill 

see complete table

In Men's Downhill World Cup 1968/69 the best 3 results count. Karl Schranz won the cup with maximum points.

Giant Slalom 

see complete table

In Men's Giant Slalom World Cup 1968/69 the best 3 results count.

Slalom 

see complete table

In Men's Slalom World Cup 1968/69 the best 3 results count. The one and only World Cup ever shared by more than two racers. Three French athletes tied with one Austrian.

Women

Overall 

In Women's Overall World Cup 1968/69 the best three downhills, best three giant slaloms and best three slaloms count. 15 racers had a point deduction.

Downhill 

see complete table

In Women's Downhill World Cup 1968/69 the best 3 results count.

Giant Slalom 

see complete table

In Women's Giant Slalom World Cup 1968/69 the best 3 results counted. Marilyn Cochran won the cup without a win, but was runner-up in the final five races.

Slalom 

see complete table

Gertrude Gabl won the cup with maximum points.

Nations Cup

Overall

Men

Women

Medal table

References

External links
FIS-ski.com – World Cup standings – 1969

 
FIS Alpine Ski World Cup
World Cup
World Cup